The 1908 international cricket season was from April 1908 to August 1908.

Season overview

August

Philadelphia in Ireland

Philadelphia in England

References

International cricket competitions by season
1908 in cricket